Stockwell is a settlement in South Australia. Stockwell is named after Samuel Stockwell, an early landowner in the area. Stockwell was a station on the Truro railway line from 1917 to 1968 when the line closed to regular service.

References

Towns in South Australia
Barossa Valley